The 2021–22 Dream11 Super Smash was the fifteenth season of the women's Super Smash Twenty20 cricket competition played in New Zealand. It took place between 26 November 2021 and 29 January 2022. Canterbury Magicians were the defending champions.

The tournament ran alongside the 2021–22 Hallyburton Johnstone Shield.

Wellington Blaze won the tournament after defeating Otago Sparks in the final, winning their 7th title.

Competition format
Teams played in a double round-robin in a group of six, therefore playing 10 matches overall. Matches were played using a Twenty20 format. The top team in the group advanced straight to the final, whilst the second and third placed teams played off in an elimination final.

The group worked on a points system with positions being based on the total points. Points were awarded as follows:

Win: 4 points 
Tie: 2 points 
Loss: 0 points.
Abandoned/No Result: 2 points.

Points table

 advances to Grand Final
 advances to Elimination Final

Fixtures

Round-robin

Finals

Statistics

Most runs

Source: ESPN Cricinfo

Most wickets

Source: ESPN Cricinfo

Notes

References

External links
 Series home at ESPN Cricinfo

Super Smash (cricket)
2021–22 New Zealand cricket season
Super Smash (women's cricket)